Gangavaram can refer to:
 Gangavaram, Visakhapatnam
 Gangavaram, Konaseema district
 Gangavaram mandal, Konaseema district
 Gangavaram, Chittoor district
 Gangavaram, Kakinada district
 Gangavaram Port